Telstar: The Joe Meek Story is a 2008 film adaptation of James Hicks' and Nick Moran's play Telstar, about record producer Joe Meek, which opened at the New Ambassadors Theatre in London's West End in June 2005. The film is directed by Nick Moran and stars Con O'Neill, who also played Joe Meek in the original play, while Kevin Spacey plays Meek's business partner, Major Wilfred Banks.

Plot
The film tells the story of record producer Joe Meek, the songwriter-producer behind the 1960s hits "Have I the Right?", "Just Like Eddie" and "Johnny Remember Me". The film charts Meek's initial success with the multi-million selling record, "Telstar", his homosexuality, which was illegal in the UK at the time, and his struggles with debt, paranoia and depression, which culminated in the killing of his landlady Violet Shenton and himself, on 3 February 1967.

Cast

Con O'Neill as Joe Meek
Kevin Spacey as Major Wilfred Banks
Pam Ferris as Mrs Violet Shenton
JJ Feild as Heinz Burt
James Corden as Clem Cattini
Tom Burke as Geoff Goddard
Ralf Little as Chas Hodges
Sid Mitchell as Patrick Pink (aka Robbie Duke)
Mathew Baynton as Ritchie Blackmore
Shaun Evans as Billy Kuy
Callum Dixon as John Leyton
Tom Harper as Alan Caddy
Jon Lee as Billy Fury
Nigel Harman as Jess Conrad
Carl Barât as Gene Vincent
Justin Hawkins as Screaming Lord Sutch
Nick Moran as Alex Meek
Jess Conrad as Larry Parnes
Clem Cattini as Chauffeur
Chas Hodges as Mr Brolin
John Leyton as Sir Edward
Robbie Duke as Stagehand
Mike Sarne as Backstage Manager
David Hayler as John Peel
Craig Vye as Mitch Mitchell
Joan Hodges as Biddy Meek
Jimmy Carr as Gentleman
Jim Field Smith as Ken Howard
Marcus Brigstocke as Alan Blaikley
Rita Tushingham as Essex Medium
Gary Whelan as Detective
Jack Roth as Youth
Guy Lewis as Charles Blackwell (Music Arranger)
Alan Scally as George Bellamy
Dominic Arnall as Roger LaVern

Some of those portrayed in the film assisted with the production, or appeared in minor roles playing older characters alongside the actors portraying their younger selves. Singer Chas Hodges, who appears as Meek's enraged neighbour, complaining about the noise by banging a dustbin lid, recommended Carl Barât of the Libertines for the role of Gene Vincent, whilst Tornados drummer Clem Cattini appears in a scene as John Leyton's chauffeur and provided advice on set design. Leyton himself plays the fictional "Sir Edward", and singer-actor Jess Conrad plays pop manager Larry Parnes. Meek's young protégée, Patrick Pink (now known as Robbie Duke), appears as a stagehand.

Criticism
After the premiere, Robbie Duke, formerly Patrick Pink, who had been Meek's young protégée and was present when Meek killed his landlady and himself, was very upset how the filmmakers had portrayed his relationship with Joe Meek, suggesting that they had been lovers. He expressed his anger for the press, and also posted an open letter to the filmmakers on the Internet, where he demanded a public apology. Similarly, the family of Heinz Burt has also criticized the film for portraying him as Meek's lover, claiming that Heinz Burt did not have a close relationship with Meek, and was also not a homosexual as portrayed in the film.

Critical reception
Siobhan Synnot of the Scotland on Sunday praised the film because it did not employ the usual "cinematic gloss". She opined that it begins with a humorous tone but transforms into a "harrowing film", adding that Telstar "knocks the wind out of the sails" of The Boat That Rocked in that the performances are "more substantial and engaged". Synnot concluded that "like Meek's records, Telstar is raw, fatalistic and somewhat crudely put together, but it also boasts both-barrels, mega-watt energy."

See also
 A Life in the Death of Joe Meek

References

External links

2008 films
2008 biographical drama films
British biographical drama films
British LGBT-related films
British plays
British docudrama films
Films set in London
LGBT-related musical films
LGBT-related plays
Film controversies
LGBT-related controversies in film
LGBT-related controversies in plays
2000s musical drama films
British rock music films
2008 LGBT-related films
2008 drama films
Biographical films about musicians
Films scored by Ilan Eshkeri
2000s English-language films
Films directed by Nick Moran
2000s British films